Ignacio Suárez Sureda (born November 20, 1964 in León, Spain) is a retired basketball player.

Clubs
1983–84: Ebro Manresa
1984–85: CB L'Hospitalet
1985–86: Procesator Mataró
1986–88: CD Oximesa
1988–91: Club Ourense Baloncesto
1991–93: CB Murcia
1993–94: CB Peñas Huesca

References
 ACB profile

1964 births
Living people
Spanish men's basketball players
Liga ACB players
Bàsquet Manresa players
CB Granada players
CB Murcia players
Point guards
Sportspeople from León, Spain
Club Ourense Baloncesto players
CB Peñas Huesca players
CB L'Hospitalet players